The 50 Greatest EuroLeague Contributors (2008) of FIBA European Champions Cup and EuroLeague history were awarded and chosen on February 3, 2008, in Madrid, Spain. The occasion was the fiftieth anniversary since the founding of the inaugural season of the FIBA European Champions Cup, which is officially recognized as the predecessor of today's modern EuroLeague competition, which is the premier level men's basketball league in Europe.

The list was made up of 35 players, 10 coaches, and 5 referees that were deemed to have contributed the most to the growth of the EuroLeague. It also included other nominees for each category. All together, 105 players, 20 coaches, and 12 referees in total were nominated.

Contributors

Players
The following is the list of 35 awarded players.

Coaches
The following is the list of 10 awarded coaches.

Referees
The following is the list of 5 awarded referees.

Other nominees that were not selected

70 Player nominees
Years in parentheses indicate years played as a senior men's club basketball player in all leagues, not just the EuroLeague.

10 Coach nominees
Years in parentheses indicate years spent as a basketball coach, in all competitions, not just the EuroLeague.

7 Referee nominees

See also
EuroLeague Basketball 2001–10 All-Decade Team
EuroLeague Awards
EuroLeague Basketball
FIBA's 50 Greatest Players (1991)

Notes

References

External links 
Official Page
History principal 2

EuroLeague awards and honors
Golden jubilees